Robert or Bob Perry may refer to:

Sportspeople
Bob Perry (baseball) (1934–2017), American baseball player
Bob Perry (footballer) (1893–?), Scottish footballer
Bob Perry (tennis) (born 1933), American tennis player
Robert Perry (sailor) (1909–1987), British sailor

Others
Bob J. Perry (1932–2013), Houston builder and political funder
Robert Perry (actor) (1878–1962), American film actor
B. G. Perry (1931–2016), Mississippi politician
Robert H. Perry (1924–1978), editor of Perry's Chemical Engineers' Handbook
Robert J. Perry, American physicist
Robert Perry (writer), Welsh television writer
Robert Perry (yacht designer), American designer of modern cruising yachts
Robert Thompson Perry (born 1960), American author and teacher
Bob Perry (producer), who produced many on the List of songs recorded by Tupac Shakur

See also
Robert Parry (disambiguation)
Robert Peary (1856–1920), American explorer known for his expedition to the North Pole